Melody of Love or Singing City (original title Città canora) is a 1952 Italian musical melodrama film directed by Mario Costa and starring Giacomo Rondinella, Maria Fiore and Nadia Gray.

It was shot at Cinecitta Studios in Rome and on location in Naples. The film's sets were designed by the art director Lamberto Giovagnoli.

Cast 
Nadia Gray as Nadia Sandor
Maria Fiore as Maria Morelli 
Giacomo Rondinella as Giacomo D'Angeli
Tina Pica as Concetta
Paola Borboni as Anna
Carlo Romano as Commendator Ferrario 
Mirko Ellis as Renato Scala
Giovanni Grasso as Don Salvatore Morelli
Giuseppe Porelli as Don Raffaele Scotto
Leila Calabrese as Governante di Don Raffaele 
 Dante and Beniamino Maggio as Pasquale and Nicola
Amalia Pellegrini as Amalia
Vittorio Bottone
Salvatore Cafiero
Arturo Gigliati
Luigi De Simone

References

Bibliography
 Chiti, Roberto & Poppi, Roberto. Dizionario del cinema italiano: Dal 1945 al 1959. Gremese Editore, 1991.
 Marlow-Mann, Alex. The New Neapolitan Cinema. Edinburgh University Press, 2011.

External links
 
 Melody of love at Variety Distribution

1952 films
1950s Italian-language films
Films directed by Mario Costa
Melodrama films
Italian musical drama films
1950s musical drama films
Italian black-and-white films
Films shot at Cinecittà Studios
Films shot in Naples
Films set in Naples
1950s Italian films